Zacatelco is a city and capital of Zacatelco municipality located south of the state of Tlaxcala. According to the population census conducted by the National Institute of Statistics and Geography 2010, the city has a population of 38.466 people, it is the sixth most populous city in the state and is part of the Metropolitan area of Puebla. The city is also head of the third electoral district of Tlaxcala.

The city was founded on December 1, 1529, by Agustín de Castañeda. In 1723 it is very important because it forms Zacatelco republic; this is achieved by joining the towns of San Juan, San Lorenzo, Santo Toribio, Santa Catarina, San Marcos and San Antonio, which depended on Tepeyanco. The most important historical figures of the city were the brothers Arenas, prominent revolutionaries. Domingo Arenas took the first land committee of Mexico in 1915, was one reason for coining the phrase battle: Zacatelco; the heart of south.

Zacatelco is located in the southern part of the valley of Tlaxcala, on the border with the state of Puebla, is at an altitude of 2,210 meters above sea level, making it one of the highest cities in Mexico. It is located just 11.9 km from the state capital, 27.1 km from the city of Puebla and 121.8 km from Mexico City.

History

Prehispanic Period

The first human settlements discovered in Zacatelco correspond to culture or cultural Tlatempa phase, between 1200 B. C. and 800 B. C. These settlements are a scattered village and a town, probably the same Zacatelco, where high architectural structure in the boundary is observed with the present municipality of Tepeyanco.

Between 800 and 350 B. C., the Texoloc phase and develops according to the mapping done by the Puebla-Tlaxcala Archaeological Project (PAPT), in the town of Zacatelco a large town or city is located adjacent to Cholula. For Tezoquipan phase, in the area now occupied by the town of Zacatelco, you can locate a town bordering Cholula, also it is known that there was contact with two villages and a people more than the municipalities of Tepeyanco and Tetlatlahuca. Although there is no evidence of the existence of sites in what is now Zacatelco, if it is known that during this phase was under the influence of Cholula and stay there apparently.

Despite this, most historians refer only to the four domains that form the Republic of Tlaxcala and the arrival of the Spaniards their chiefs are the lords of Tlaxcala. According to this division, Zacatelco belonged to the lordship of Ocotelulco until the arrival of Hispanics on tlaxcaltecas land

Modern Age

On January 18, General Oscar Aguilar returned to the state capital, from Zacatelco; where he disarmed a group that had taken up arms in order to prevent Ignacio Mendoza assumed the governorship of the state. The general Aguilar could seize 56 firearms political sides of Zacatelco; several members however were the state of Puebla. To ensure order in the region, a federal garrison of 40 men who avoided the more serious events occurred was established in the village of Zacatelco.

In Zacatelco, it is progress in education and culture are concerned. In March 1955 the first called "Secondary Teaching Number 19 Mariano Matamoros" High School was established, and in that same year the work of Amado Morales Cordero entitled tlaxcalteca Geonimia, reference work published Nahuatl language.

On May 5, 1967, the municipal park opened Zacatelco. In 1970 the building of the municipal market opens. On July 2, 1971, Augusto Gomez Villanueva made a visit to the bank, where he gave audience to several committees of farmers, including one of Zacatelco, to discuss matters related manning suburbs. On March 10, 1972, was instituted in the district of Capula, in the "Domingo Arenas' primary school, the school of Sciences and Humanities (high school), joined the UNAM. The inscriptions were called by the then director Ing. Jorge Antonio Acevedo. On June 1, 1980,  José López Portillo, opens Zacatelco resort.

Geography

Location

Located in the Mexican plateau 2,210 meters above sea level, the town of Zacatelco is located in a geographic coordinate axis between 19 degrees 13 minutes north latitude and 98 degrees 14 minutes west longitude.

Located south of the state in Poblano-Tlaxcala Valley, the town of Zacatelco bordered on the north by the municipalities of San Lorenzo Axocomanitla Tepeyanco and southern borders with the state of Puebla, east boundaries set by the municipalities of Santa Catarina Ayometla Santa Cruz Xicohtzinco Quilehtla and also to the west borders the municipalities of Tetlatlahuca and Natívitas, forming and one of the municipalities of the Metropolitan area of Puebla.

Symbols of the municipality

Zacatelco Township is located in the tourist route "Cacaxtla Xochitécatl", this route brings sexy southwest of the entity and its core the archaeological site of Cacaxtla-Xochitécatl, one of the most attractive and interesting city. The municipality is located south of the state, 12 km., From the city of Tlaxcala on Highway 119 Puebla-Tlaxcala and 10 km., The State Capital. In the city, we recommend visiting La Parroquia de Santa Inés, which counts among its main attractions, the monumental altarpiece has in the main altar made entirely of wood. Zacatelco offers its local, national and international visitors, and interesting places to visit and enjoy, which promise to be a real treat aspects. The main tourist attraction that is worth visiting is the Resort Zacatelco.

Monument Domingo Arenas
Dedicated to South maimed, the revolutionary leader imposes proud on his horse in Central Park Zacatelco. Called by locals as "the horse". Domingo Arenas, Tlaxcala, on August 4, 1888; was the son of Francisco Arenas and Margarita Perez, both of peasant origin. He worked as a herdsman, bread deliveryman worker in various factories. When exploding the fight against Porfirio Díaz entered the maderistas under the command of General Felipe Villegas forces. His brother, Cirilo Pérez Arenas was the most important maderista of Tlaxcala, after proclaimed the Plan de Ayala adhered quickly and had major struggles of weapons both in Tlaxcala and Puebla.

Parish of Santa Ines

This building was built in the second half of the eighteenth century, replacing the original of the sixteenth century. Its cover, Baroque, contains decorative elements such as polygonal pilasters with acanthus leaves that frame alluding to the Roman martyr images. Inside has one of the most remarkable architectural structures of Tlaxcala, achieved based on fluted pilasters and Ionic capitals and beautiful roofs. The dome reminiscent of Puebla Cathedral, in the presbytery is a large altarpiece where stipes and twisted columns are combined.

This altarpiece is distinguished by its streets, concave and convex, among which highlight the canvases shown archangels and figures of the cusp, the representation of San Miguel "captain of the heavenly host" and other carvings from the seventeenth century. The parish also keeps a stoup, one-piece, which was carved from basalt in the early seventeenth century heraldic motifs whose sides were recorded with the wounds of Christ, symbol of the Franciscans.

Hydrography

The water resources of the municipality are: permanent stream flow, four streams flow only during the rainy season, a small dam for water extraction wells and springs resort. Sample of water resources. Ameyal of Ametoxtla, municipality waters of Zahuapan and Atoyac rivers.

Climate 
In the municipality is considered temperate climate humid, with rainfall in the months of June to September, The hottest months are from March to June. The wind direction is generally north to south, also the average annual minimum temperature recorded was 8.2 °C and the maximum is 26.2 °C. The annual rainfall during the period when the city is 1048.9 mm and minimum rainfall recorded is 0.6 mm and the maximum of 286.2

Culture

Annual Fair

Zacatelco Fair, which is a combination of faith, tradition and culture. The festival is in honor of the virgin Santa Ines, which stands as the patron of Zacatelco since December 1, 1529. It is celebrated on January 21 every year. This community festival is celebrated with artistic, cultural, sporting and religious order activities.

It is customary in most inhabitants of this city entertain guests on the day of the fair with a special food offered to celebrate the occasion which usually consists of rice, mole poblano and sometimes barbecue.

If you have the fortune to have a friend, relative or acquaintance native to this region and in correspondence to their friendship or cronyism invites you to the "village fair" surely enjoy a delicious meal. Therefore, a guest is a good idea to get a present, which can be fruits, bread or expend party right there.

The Dance of the Chivarrudos

The dance of the chivarrudos recalls that tasks performed cowboys herding, goatherds and foremen of the cattle ranches of Tlaxcala in the late nineteenth and early twentieth centuries. This dance spans several municipalities in the south of the state, as Zacatelco, Xicohtzinco and Quiletla, which has more than a century practiced. Your name "CHIVARRUDOS" comes from his tanned which are obtained from the skins of goats, which are placed as chaps to dance giving off a scent, like say a lot: "a guy" and that few can bear to be near they. These men personify dressed goatherds, cowboys, wranglers, laborers, foremen and riders caregivers of farm animals, including goats and goats were and running from north to south through the fields at the end of the nineteenth and early twentieth centuries.

Regularly dressed in dark pants on who lead chaps or "chivarras" (made of goatskin with hair that give reference to the name of the group), white shirt, black jacket, bandana (in general red knotted around his neck ), an unmistakable coloreteada cow mask red with bulging eyebrows and mustache; instead of eyes mask has two small holes where they see; accompany her outfit quarter, black boots, wide brim hat painted in different colors, and finally are mounted on a small wooden horse.

The suit is a joke or parody of cattle drovers past centuries. They are accompanied by the rhythmic sound of teponaxtle (huehuetl, prehispanic drum), which is hammered by a performer with a couple of rolls, the rhythm used to accompany the dance of the chivarrudos resembles somewhat of a horse trotting.

Gastronomy

Cacao Drink

One of the traditional drinks and distinguishes the municipality as well as the state of Tlaxcala is the drink of cacao, also known among people as Water Canyon. This particular drink was called Intangible Cultural Heritage by the State Congress. As part of social development that has the municipality Zacatelco citizenship and to save the cultural and gastronomic richness of the town in 2014 the director of economic development, Renal Calzada Morales, started the organization for the First Fair of Cacao in the Zocalo city that was held during 24th to October 26, I attended more than five thousand people. This first show also included various activities such as car show and canine, artistic events. If you visit this town do not hesitate to try this drink.

Drink Cocoa everyday rooted more tradition, it is not only in the center of Zacatelco where it is sold, but in several parts of town from the fifth section to the first section, even this tradition of drinking cocoa is moving to Xicohtzinco the municipalities of Santa Catarina Ayometla and Axocomanitla. It is important to note that when sold in other municipalities can see how the merchants of the so-called "Water Canyon" an apron standing with the legend that says Cocoa Zacatelco.

traditional way to serve it is invariably red bowls decorated with figures; although it now serves even in polyethylene bags and plastic cups with straw, the tradition of drinking in the gourd is unique and produces a feeling of delicacy on the palate.

Another important element is the way to beat it, around which has created a legend that says: Cocoa can only be beaten by one person and if someone does lose its consistency; also, it is said: The person who prepares it should not be angry, because it will not generate foam and it will taste bitter.

When Zacatelco is invited to participate in gastronomic and fairs like Tlaxcala exhibitions, zacatelquenses do not miss an opportunity to offer visitors the cocoa drink as traditional and representative of the municipality, for example in an interview during the Feria de Tlaxcala 2012, the zacatelquenses said that the show was an excellent opportunity to market (the cocoa drink), as families met a cool, tasty drink and has established itself in the south of the entity.

Sister cities

  Camagüey, Cuba (2010)

References

External links

  Zip Codes.
  City of Zacatelco official website.

Populated places in Tlaxcala
Populated places established in 1529